Lefebre, Lefèbre, LeFebre, or Le Febre is a common surname, related to the French surname Lefebvre. Notable people with this surname include:

 Valentin Lefebre (1637–1677), Flemish painter, draughtsman and printmaker
 Edward A. Lefebre (1834–1911), American virtuosic saxophonist 
 Joseph Oscar Lefebre Boulanger (1888–1958), Canadian politician and lawyer
 Bobby LeFebre (born 1982), American poet

See also 
 Lefèvre
 Lefébure